Northam is a surname. Notable people with the surname include:

 Bill Northam (1905–1988), Australian Olympic yachtsman
 Cyril Northam (1894–1981), English footballer
 Jackie Northam, American broadcast reporter
 Jeremy Northam (born 1961), British actor
 John Northam (1922–2004), professor emeritus of literature and drama at Cambridge University and father of Jeremy Northam
 Ralph Northam (born 1959), American politician and physician

English toponymic surnames